The 1989–90 Elitserien season was the 15th season of the Elitserien, the top level of ice hockey in Sweden. 12 teams participated in the league, and Djurgårdens IF won the championship.

Standings

First round

Final round

Playoffs

External links
 Swedish Hockey League seasons official site
1990 Swedish national championship finals at SVT's open archive 

Swe
1989–90 in Swedish ice hockey
Swedish Hockey League seasons